The Duke of York, known as the Duke of York Hotel for many years and now as Duke Live, is a historic structure in Leslieville, Toronto, Ontario. It is located at 1225 Queen Street East, at the corner of Queen Street and Leslie Avenue.

The building site was originally known as "Uncle Tom's Cabin", presumably after the novel or Ontario site of the same name. A brick structure on the same lot, originally known as the Morin House, was constructed in 1870. The name later changed to the Duke of York Hotel.

Originally known as "The Duke of York", the building served as an inn with a restaurant/pub on the main floor. The inn no longer operates, but the restaurant and bar is still in business. For many years a mural of John Wayne was painted on the wall of the first floor of the building's exterior. The original name of this first location is likely for the Duke of York at the time, Prince Frederick, Duke of York and Albany.

See also
Other surviving taverns and inns in Toronto:

 Lambton House
 Miller Tavern
 Montgomery's Inn
 Spadina Hotel

References

External links

 History of the Duke of York at the Leslieville Historical Society

Houses in Toronto
Hotels in Toronto
Defunct hotels in Canada